Delfino Thermignon (Turin May 26, 1861 – Narzole May 30, 1944) was an Italian composer, conductor, and teacher.

Life 
He studied with Carlo Pedrotti, Carlo Fassò and Lorenzo Bellardi at the Liceo Musicale of Turin, After the diploma in 1883 Thermignon moved to Regensburg to complete his studies with Franz Xaver Haberl, at the Kirchenmusikschule that Haberl had founded in 1874. A noted musician and musicologist, Haberl was the pioneering editor of the complete works of Palestrina and Lassus. At the same Liceo Musicale later he taught  musical theory (1882–89), choral singing (1886–93) and singing (1889-1900). 
In the ten years from 1890 to 1900 he was director of the Accademia di canto corale Stefano Tempia di Turin.

In 1900 Thermignon was appointed Maestro of the Cappella Marciana at San Marco's Basilica in Venice as successor of Lorenzo Perosi, position that he held till 1921. Back to Turin he was teacher at the Liceo Musicale till 1932.

He died in Narzole in 1944.

Compositions 
Un'Astuzia d'amore, opera (1890)
L'Assedio di Canelli, opera (1894)
San Marco, oratorio (1908)
L'Annunciazione di Maria Vergine (1911)
Missa Te Rogamus Domine, a 3 voices
Missa pro defunctis secunda
masses, motets and several choral pieces including Audi benigne Conditor

Writings
Teoria elementare e regole musicali
Manuale di musica ad uso delle Scuole e Società corali

Sources 
De Angelis, Alberto: L'Italia musicale d'oggi, dizionario dei musicisti (1918)

External links
 
Accademia corale Stefano Tempia (Italian)

1861 births
1944 deaths
Musicians from Turin
Italian classical composers
Italian male classical composers
20th-century classical composers
Cecilian composers
Cappella Marciana composers
20th-century Italian composers
20th-century Italian male musicians
Cappella Marciana maestri